St Enda's GAA may refer to:

Ballyboden St Enda's GAA, a sports club in Knocklyon, South Dublin, Ireland
Omagh St Enda's GAA, a sports club
St Enda's GAC, a sports club

See also
 Naomh Éanna GAA (Gorey), a sports club